Kumardhubi is an inhabited place in the Dhanbad district of Jharkhand state, India.

Geography

Location
Kumardubi is not identified as a separate place/ mouza in the 2011 census data, As per the map of Nirsa CD Block on page 132 of District Census Handbook, Dhanbad Kumardubi seems to be included in Chirkunda, but it is not clear.

Note: The map alongside presents some of the notable locations in the area. All places marked in the map are linked in the larger full-screen map.

Overview
The region shown in the map is a part of the undulating uplands bustling with coalmines. While the Damodar flows along the southern boundary, the Barakar flows along the eastern boundary. Both the rivers form the boundary with West Bengal.  
Panchet Dam and Maithon Dam, along their reservoirs, are prominently visible in the map. The entire area is covered in Nirsa (community development block). In Nirsa CD block 69% of the population live in rural areas and 31% live in urban areas. The   official website of the district has announced the formation of two new CD blocks – Egarkund and Kaliasole, possibly carved out of Nirsa CD block. As of July 2019, there is no further information about the new CD blocks. BCCL operates Chanch/ Victoria Area partially within the region shown in the map. ECL operates Mugma Area fully within the region shown in the map.

Attractions 
There are two must-visit places near Kumardhubi. First, Maithon Dam and second, Panchet Dam. Maithon dam was specially designed for flood control and generates 60,000 kW of electric power. There is an underground power station, the first of its kind in the whole of South East Asia.

Economy

Industry  
Kumardhubi is the heart of coal belt, which gives rise to a number of Industrial opportunities in the area. Kumardubi is known for the manufacturing of 'Fire Bricks', as fire clay is found here in large quantity. There are a number of small manufacturing units, which are indulged in making 'stone chips crusher'.

The area is also known for its British-era metal casting company "Kumardhubi Metal Casting and Engineering Limited (KMCEL)"  that produced track sections used in underground mines and employed around 850 workers at the time of its closure in 1995.

Originally owned by Bird Company during the British era, Kumardhubi Engineering Works was taken over by the Bengal government and run till 1979, after which it was taken over by Bihar State Industrial Development Corporation. It was renamed Kumardhubi Metal Casting and Engineering Limited in 1983 with the BSIDC and Tata Steel jointly running it till 1995. At the time, Tata Steel owned 49 per cent stake while BSIDC remained the majority partner with 51 per cent stake.

Another manufacturing industry that brings interest in this area is, McNally Bharat Engineering Company Ltd. (MBE) which is one of the leading Engineering Companies in India. MBECL, the parent company of MSEL, started its business from this place in 1961. The Kumardhubi unit is an integrated unit having Engineering and Design, Marketing and Product Support, Purchase, Manufacturing, Assembly and QA under one roof to provide customers a total solution from Design to Installation and Commissioning.

Kumardhubi unit manufactures all types of crushers, screens, grinding mills, feeders and other equipment for bulk material handling, port handling and ash handling.

Kumardhubi is also the hub of old and used sarees, which are repaired, cleaned and polished, and are sent back to the market for re-selling.

Coal mining
As per ECL website telephone numbers, operational collieries in the Mugma Area of Eastern Coalfields in 2018 are: Badjna Colliery, Bermury OCP, Chapapur Colliery, Gopinathpur Colliery, Hariajam Colliery, Kumardhubi Colliery, Khoodia Colliery, Kapasara Colliery, Lakhimata Colliery, Mandman Colliery, Rajpura OCP and Shampur B.

Transport

There is a station at Kumardubi on the Asansol-Gaya section, which is a part of the Grand Chord, Howrah-Gaya-Delhi line and Howrah-Allahabad-Mumbai line.

Kumardubi is on the old Grand Trunk Road. NH 19 (old numbering NH 2), running from Agra to Kolkata, leaves GT Road at/ near Brindabanpur and passes mostly outside the crowded towns and mining areas and rejoins GT Road after Asansol.

Education
SHMS Inter Mahavidyalaya was established at Kumardubi in 1979. It is a private co-educational institution.

References

Villages in Dhanbad district